Hajdúsámson  is a town in Hajdú-Bihar county, in the Northern Great Plain region of eastern Hungary.

Geography

Twin towns – sister cities

Hajdúsámson is twinned with:
 Belene, Bulgaria
 Sândominic, Romania

References

External links

 (in Hungarian)

 
Populated places in Hajdú-Bihar County